Komminenivaripalem is a village in Prakasam district of the Indian state of Andhra Pradesh. It is located in Ballikurava mandal.

References 

Villages in Prakasam district